Arthouse animation is a combination of art film and animated film.

Examples of arthouse animated films

1940 to 1998

Fantasia (1940)
Neighbours (1952)
 Journey to the Beginning of Time (1955)
 Invention for Destruction (1958)
 The Fabulous Baron Munchausen (1962)
Game of Angels (1964)
Time Piece (1965)
The Glass Harmonica (1968)
Fritz the Cat (1972)
Johnny Corncob (1973)
Belladonna of Sadness (1973)
Fantastic Planet (1973)
Hedgehog in the Fog (1975)
Allegro Non Troppo (1976)
Watership Down (1978)
Tale of Tales (1979)
Asparagus (1979)
Son of the White Mare (1981)
Dimensions of Dialogue (1982)
The Plague Dogs (1982)
Angel's Egg (1985)
The Brave Little Toaster (1987)
Wicked City (1987)
Akira (1988)
Alice (1988)
Only Yesterday (1991)
The Thief and the Cobbler (1993)
Faust (1994)
Ghost in the Shell (1995)
Perfect Blue (1997)
Princess Mononoke (1997)
Kirikou and the Sorceress (1998)
The Prince of Egypt (1998)

2000 - present

Millennium Actress (2001)
Waking Life (2001)
Spirited Away (2001)
The Triplets of Belleville (2003)
Ghost in the Shell 2: Innocence (2004)
Mind Game (2004)
Paprika (2006)
A Scanner Darkly (2006)
Persepolis (2007)
Waltz with Bashir (2008)
 Coraline (2009)
The Secret of Kells (2009)
A Town Called Panic (2009)
Mary and Max (2009)
Chico and Rita (2011)
From Up on Poppy Hill (2011)
The Rabbi's Cat (2011)
The King of Pigs (2011)
Consuming Spirits (2012)
It's Such a Beautiful Day (2012)
Song of the Sea (2014)
Anomalisa (2015)
My Life as a Courgette (2016)
In This Corner of the World (2016)
The Red Turtle (2016)
Seoul Station (2016)
Tower (2016)
Have a Nice Day (2017)
Loving Vincent (2017)
The Breadwinner (2017)
Isle of Dogs (2018)
I Lost My Body (2019)
Bombay Rose (2019)
 Wolfwalkers (2020)
 Cryptozoo (2021)
Flee (2021)
Bestia (2021)
The Windshield Wiper (2021)
Marcel the Shell with Shoes On (2022)
Mad God (2022)

Notable arthouse animators

Walerian Borowczyk
Suzan Pitt
Bruno Bozzetto
Sylvain Chomet
Gene Deitch
Michaël Dudok de Wit
Adam Elliot
Ari Folman
Don Hertzfeldt
Marcell Jankovics
Andrei Khrzhanovsky
Satoshi Kon
Yoji Kuri
René Laloux
Richard Linklater
Hayao Miyazaki
Tomm Moore
Yuri Norstein
Michel Ocelot
Stephen and Timothy Quay
Joanna Quinn
Martin Rosen
Dash Shaw
Jan Švankmajer
Osamu Tezuka
Masaaki Yuasa
Karel Zeman

See also
Studio Ghibli
Cartoon Saloon
Independent animation
Adult animation
Cult film
Experimental animation
Rotoscoping
Modernist film
Postmodernist film
Minimalist film
Maximalist film
Indiewood

External links
Art-House Animation - Criterion Channel Teaser trailer on Vimeo
The 100 best animated movies: the best arty movies

References

History of animation
1950s in film
1960s in film
1970s in film
1980s in film
1990s in film
2000s in film
2010s in film
2020s in film
Film genres
1950s in animation
1960s in animation
1970s in animation
1980s in animation
1990s in animation
2000s in animation
2010s in animation
2020s in animation
Modern art
Postmodern art